Timelaea is a genus of butterflies in the family Nymphalidae. The genus was erected by Hippolyte Lucas in 1883.

Species
Timelaea maculata (Bremer & Grey, [1852])
Timelaea albescens (Oberthür, 1886)
Timelaea aformis Chou, 1994
Timelaea radiata Chou & Wang, 1994
Timelaea nana Leech, 1893

External links

Apaturinae
Nymphalidae genera
Taxa named by Hippolyte Lucas